Namig Mammadov (born on 1 February 1976 in Arjut, Kirovakan District, Armenian SSR in the present day Lori Province of Armenia) is an Azerbaijani public figure, businessman and maecenas. He is Caspel LLC company's chairman of the board, and was a member of the Broadcasting Council of İctimai (Public) Television and Radio Broadcasting Company (2009–2015).

Early life 

Namig Mammadov was born on February 1, 1976 in Arjut, Kirovakan District, Armenian SSR (present day Arjut, Lori Province, Armenia) to a family of teachers. Because of reprisals by Armenians against Azerbaijanis in 1988, many local Azerbaijani had to leave own lands as well as their family. Mammadov and his family had to flee from their homeland to Baku.

Education 

In 1983, Namig Mammadov went to Arjut village's secondary school. He studied there until 1988, when he continued his secondary education at Baku secondary school No. 115 until 1992. In 1992, he entered the Young Talents Lyceum and graduated in 1993.

He was admitted to the Economy and Management faculty at Khazar University in 1993, and after being transferred to the "Engineering Economy and Management" faculty at Azerbaijan State Economic University (UNEC), graduated in 2003.

Namig Mammadov attended Baku State University from 2004 to 2008, graduating with bachelor's degree in Law. He later studied at Kutafin Moscow State Law University.

Business career and politics 

In 1992, he was made Regulator of Computers at Marko Computer Technologies. In 1999, after completing military service, he was made Sales Manager at Caspian American Telecom. In 2000, he became Head of Sales and Marketing Department at Caspian American Telecom.

From 2001–2002, he worked as the Main Sales Manager at R.I.S.K., a scientific production company.

From 2002–2005, he started to work as Head Manager at "Caspian Eleсtronics". In 2005, he became an Executive Director at "Caspel" LLC. From 2008 onward he held the position of chairman of the board at "Caspel" LLC.

From 2009 to 2015, he was a member of Broadcasting Council of İctimai (Public) Television and Radio Broadcasting Company by the resolution of Milli Majlis (National Parliament) of Azerbaijan Republic.

Awards 
Namig Mammadov was awarded the Taraggi Medal (Progress Medal) on February 6, 2014, by decree of the President of the Republic of Azerbaijan.

Academic articles 
 Мамедов Н.М., «Развитие информационного законодательства Азербайджанской Республики».  Информационное право: Актуальные проблемы теории и практики. Сборник докладов научно-практической конференции. Москва, МГЮА. 3 апреля 2015 г. Стр. 60–62.
 Мамедов Н.М., «Об открытости деятельности государственных органов».  Информационное право: Актуальные проблемы теории и практики. Сборник докладов Международной научно-практической конференции. Москва, МГЮА. 7 апреля 2016 г. Стр. 68–72.
 Мамедов Н.М., «Развитие електронного правительства в Азербайджанской Республике».  Стратегия национального развития и задачи юридической науки. Сборник докладов. Москва, МГЮА. 2016 г. Стр. 56–58.

References

External links 

 
 

1976 births
Recipients of the Tereggi Medal
Azerbaijan State University of Economics alumni
Baku State University alumni
Azerbaijani businesspeople
Azerbaijani philanthropists
Azerbaijani jurists
People from Lori Province
Living people